LAPE, Spanish Postal Airlines (Líneas Aéreas Postales Españolas), was Spain's national airline during the Second Spanish Republic.

History
LAPE, often also spelt L.A.P.E. and colloquially known as "Las LAPE", replaced CLASSA (Compañía de Líneas Aéreas Subvencionadas), the company that had been Spain's national airline during the dictatorship of Miguel Primo de Rivera, an airline that was still reeling from the Great Depression. LAPE was established in April 1932, CLASSA flying under the Spanish Republican Flag for one year. The republican government of Spain compensated CLASSA's shareholders and established postal contracts in order to make the new airline viable. The first Douglas DC-2, part of the modernization of the fleet inherited from CLASSA, arrived in Madrid-Barajas in March 1935.

In 1932 and 1933 LAPE's air service was restricted to the Madrid-Sevilla and Madrid-Barcelona lines. In March 1934 flights to the Canary Islands were restarted and a few months later in September the line Madrid-Valencia was inaugurated. In 1935 the lines Barcelona-Palma de Mallorca, Barcelona-Valencia and Valencia-Palma de Mallorca were operated, although with interruptions. By June 1936 the company's Canary Islands line included an air service between Las Palmas and Tenerife.

The Spanish Republican Airline operated even during the Spanish Civil War in an intermittent and increasingly haphazard manner. Although a great part of the planes of its fleet were requisitioned by the Spanish Republican Air Force and used as military transports, LAPE kept operating in the Republican zones of Spain with its base in Madrid-Barajas. The Madrid-Barcelona line was functioning and it was extended to Toulouse. There was also a flight Madrid-Santander until mid-1937 when Santander fell into Nationalist hands that was flying in a wide roundabout in order to avoid the fronts. Whenever  the air battles over Madrid became too difficult to handle for the LAPE pilots, the Madrid-Barcelona line was replaced by Barcelona-Albacete. 

Towards the end of February 1939 Republican Air Force Colonel Núñez Mazas issued an order through which the LAPE fleet was concentrated in Monòver (Alicante) —far away from the fronts— in order to avoid the planes falling into enemy hands. The fleet were used to evacuate numerous Spanish Republican civil and military leaders in the last weeks of the conflict.
Finally in April 1939, after the defeat of the Spanish Republican Armed Forces that marked the end of the Civil War, the planes belonging to LAPE's fleet were expropriated by the Francoist government and repainted with the Iberia livery.

Fleet
LAPE was one of the few airlines that used the Douglas DC-1. Other planes used by LAPE included: Fokker F.VII, Spartan Executive, Caudron C.448, Breguet 470, Savoia-Marchetti S.74, Northrop Delta, Douglas DC-2, Ford Trimotor, General Aviation GA-43, Airspeed AS.6J Envoy, de Havilland Dragon Rapide and de Havilland Puss Moth.

See also
History of Iberia Airlines
Spanish Republican Air Force
List of aircraft of the Spanish Republican Air Force
List of defunct airlines of Spain

Bibliography 
 Luis Utrilla Navarro & Marcos García Cruzado, Historia de los Aeropuertos de Madrid (I), Aeropuertos Españoles y Navegación Aérea, S.A.. eds. Madrid, 2005

References

External links

LAPE Poster
LAPE Poster 1932
 LAPE - El Hangar de TJ
Timetables
LAPE Douglas DC-2-115B Model
Caudron C-445 Model
Fokker F.VIIs en España

Second Spanish Republic
Defunct airlines of Spain
Airlines disestablished in 1939
Airlines established in 1932